This list of Episcopal Academy people lists important faculty and alumni of Episcopal Academy, a co-educational school for grades Pre-K through 12 located in Newtown Square, Pennsylvania.

Alumni

Art and media

Anthony Apesos - painter, critic, and professor of Fine Arts at the Art Institute of Boston
Lionel Barrymore - actor,  Academy Award winner for his role in A Free Soul, and AA Nominee for Best Director for Madame X
John Carradine - actor
Richard Harding Davis - author, journalist, Managing Director of Harper's Weekly
Morrison Heckscher - art historian and long-time curator of the American Wing at the Metropolitan Museum of Art
Mark Kendall - artist and filmmaker, La Camioneta; recipient of the Guggenheim Fellowship and the Pew Fellowships in the Arts
R.W.B. Lewis - long-time professor of English at Yale, and winner of the Pulitzer Prize for biography
Robert A. Masciantonio - writer and director of cult films Cold Hearts, Neighbor
 Maury Henry Biddle Paul - gossip columnist known as "Cholly Knickerbocker"
M. Night Shyamalan - film producer and director, The Sixth Sense, Unbreakable, The Village, The Lady in the Water, Signs, Split, Glass, Old, Knock at the Cabin; multiple Academy Award nominee
Sarah Steele, 2006 - actress, performing in Spanglish; has appeared on The Good Fight, The Good Wife, Law & Order and Gossip Girl
 Robert Venturi, 1944 - Pritzker Prize-winning architect and postmodern theorist

Athletics

Jerome Allen - former professional basketball player with Minnesota Timberwolves, Indiana Pacers, and Denver Nuggets and current Detroit Pistons assistant coach. He also was the head coach for Penn Quakers men's basketball and an assistant coach for the Boston Celtics. 
Eddie Collins Jr.- former professional baseball player with Philadelphia Athletics and former history teacher and squash and baseball coach at Episcopal Academy.
Brian Dougherty - professional lacrosse player, inducted into the US Lacrosse Hall of Fame in 2012. 
Kyle Eckel - football player with US Naval Academy, New England Patriots, Philadelphia Eagles, Miami Dolphins, Denver Broncos and New Orleans Saints
Wayne Ellington - professional basketball player with the Los Angeles Lakers.  He also played for the New York Knicks, Minnesota Timberwolves, Miami Heat, Cleveland Cavaliers, Brooklyn Nets, Detroit Pistons, Memphis Grizzlies, Dallas Mavericks and North Carolina Tar Heels men's basketball. 
James "Bruiser" Flint - assistant coach of the Kentucky Wildcats men's basketball team and former head coach of the Drexel Dragons men's basketball team and the UMass Minutemen basketball team. He was also the assistant coach of the Indiana Hoosiers men's basketball team and UMass Minutemen basketball team and Coppin State Eagles men's basketball team. 
Matt Freese - professional soccer player with the Philadelphia Union
Todd Harrity - professional squash player, highest world ranking was #34, 3-time American champion, CSA champion while with Princeton Tigers men's squash team.
Gerald Henderson, Jr. - former professional basketball player with the Philadelphia 76ers, Portland Trail Blazers, Charlotte Hornets and Duke Blue Devils men's basketball. 
Greg Isdaner - football player, West Virginia Mountaineers football, Dallas Cowboys and Philadelphia Eagles
AJ Marcucci - professional soccer player with the New York Red Bulls
George Munger - former head coach of the Penn Quakers football team; selected to the College Football Hall of Fame in 1976

Business and technology

Britton Chance, Jr. – naval architect, designed winners of the America's Cup and the World Cup
George David - Chairman and CEO of United Technologies Corporation
Morris Duane - former chairman of Duane, Morris & Heckscher
John Haas - former Chairman of Rohm and Haas Company
Mark Hoplamazian  - President and CEO of Hyatt Hotels Corporation
 Gayle Laakman McDowell - founder, consultant, coder, speaker and author of Cracking the Coding Interview
Spencer Penrose - mining magnate, hotelier, philanthropist 
Peter York Solmssen - former General Counsel and Managing Board Member of Siemans AG
Brian Tierney - Republican strategist; CEO of Philadelphia Media Holdings
Charles L. Tutt, Sr. - real estate and mining magnate 
Robert Venturi - architect and winner of the Pritzker Prize; designed the Episcopal's Chapel in Newtown Square
Edward Vick - retired Chairman and CEO of Young and Rubicam

Government

John C. Bell, Jr. - former Governor of Pennsylvania; Chief Justice of the Pennsylvania Supreme Court
Tilton E. Doolittle - former United States Attorney for the district of Connecticut, and speaker of the Connecticut House of Representatives.
Ralph Earle (1928-2020) - diplomat and arms control negotiator
Alan Lukens - former United States ambassador to the Republic of the Congo
Boies Penrose - senator, political boss 
Benjamin Read - former Under Secretary of State under President Jimmy Carter
John Yoo - professor of law at the Boalt Hall School of Law, University of California, Berkeley; former deputy assistant attorney general in the Office of Legal Counsel of the U.S. Department of Justice during the first term of the George W. Bush presidential administration; principal author of the "Torture Memo"

Faculty
John Andrews, D.D. - the Academy's first headmaster
Noah Webster - lexicographer, textbook pioneer, English-language spelling reformer, political writer, editor, and prolific author; the "Father of American Scholarship and Education"; taught at Episcopal Academy for six months from April 1787

Others

Garry Davis - founder of the World Service Authority and creator of the first World Passport

Stephen Decatur - naval Commander during the First Barbary War, Second Barbary War, and War of 1812, youngest man to reach the rank of Navy Captain; namesake of 5 Navy ships, 46 US towns and cities, three US schools, and one school in Sigonella, Italy; the face on the 1886 Silver Certificate, equivalent to our $20 bill.  Although tradition at Episcopal Academy continues to claim Decatur as an alumnus, even assigning him to the class of 1797, no documentary evidence links him to the school.
William Chauncey Emhardt - Episcopal priest and ecumenist
Lindley Miller Garrison
John Charles Groome
Charles Stewart - with one ship he captured two British ships in the War of 1812, in 1836 captured a Portuguese slaver ship as it came into Havana, serving 63 years became the U.S. Navy's first flag officer.
William White - first and fourth Presiding Bishop of the Episcopal Church in the U.S.; first Bishop of Pennsylvania; Academy founder; Chaplain to the Continental Congress and the United States Senate

References

Lists of American people by school affiliation
^